Giordano Turrini (born 28 March 1942) is a retired Italian track cyclist who won silver medals in the individual sprint at the 1965 World Championships and 1968 Olympics. In 1968 he also won a world title in the tandem, together with Walter Gorini. After that he turned professional and won two bronze and two silver medals in the sprint at world championships. He retired in 1981.

References

1942 births
Living people
Italian male cyclists
Olympic cyclists of Italy
Olympic silver medalists for Italy
Cyclists at the 1968 Summer Olympics
Cyclists from Bologna
Olympic medalists in cycling
Medalists at the 1968 Summer Olympics